Wealth management (WM) or wealth management advisory (WMA) is an investment advisory service that provides financial management and wealth advisory services to a wide array of clients ranging from affluent to high-net-worth (HNW) and ultra-high-net-worth (UHNW) individuals and families. It is a discipline which incorporates structuring and planning wealth to assist in growing, preserving, and protecting wealth, whilst passing it onto the family in a tax-efficient manner and in accordance with their wishes. Wealth management brings together tax planning, wealth protection, estate planning, succession planning, and family governance.

Private wealth management
Private wealth management is sought by high-net-worth investors. Generally, this includes advice on the use of various estate planning vehicles, business-succession or stock-option planning, and the occasional use of hedging derivatives for large blocks of stock.

Traditionally, the wealthiest retail clients of investment firms demanded a greater level of service, product offering and sales personnel than that received by average clients. With an increase in the number of affluent investors in recent years, there has been an increasing demand for sophisticated financial solutions and expertise throughout the world.

The CFA Institute curriculum on private-wealth management indicates that two primary factors  distinguish the issues facing individual investors from those facing institutions:

 Time horizons differ. Individuals face a finite life as compared to the theoretically/potentially infinite life of institutions. This fact requires strategies for transferring assets at the end of an individual's life. These transfers are subject to laws and regulations that vary by locality and therefore the strategies available to address this situation vary. This is commonly known as accumulation and decumulation.
 Individuals are more likely to face a variety of taxes on investment returns that vary by locality. Portfolio investment techniques that provide individuals with after tax returns  that meet their objectives must address such taxes.

The term "wealth management" occurs at least as early as 1933. It came into more general use in the elite retail (or "Private Client") divisions of firms such as Goldman Sachs or Morgan Stanley (before the Dean Witter Reynolds merger of 1997), to distinguish those divisions' services from mass-market offerings, but has since spread throughout the financial-services industry. Family offices that had formerly served just one family opened their doors to other families, and the term Multi-family office was coined. Accounting firms and investment advisory boutiques created multi-family offices as well. Certain larger firms (UBS, Morgan Stanley and Merrill Lynch) have "tiered" their platforms – with separate branch systems and advisor-training programs, distinguishing "Private Wealth Management" from "Wealth Management", with the latter term denoting the same type of services but with a lower degree of customization and delivered to mass affluent clients. At Morgan Stanley, the "Private Wealth Management" retail division focuses on serving clients with greater than $20 million in investment assets while "Global Wealth Management" focuses on accounts smaller than $10 million.

In the late 1980s, private banks and brokerage firms began to offer seminars and client events designed to showcase the expertise and capabilities of the sponsoring firm. Within a few years a new  business model emerged – Family Office Exchange in 1990, the Institute for Private Investors in 1991, and CCC Alliance in 1995. These companies aimed to offer an online community as well as a network of peers for ultra high-net-worth individuals and their families. These entities have grown since the 1990s, with total IT spending (for example) by the global wealth management industry predicted to reach $35bn by 2016, including heavy investment in digital channels.

Wealth management can be provided by large corporate entities, independent financial advisers or multi-licensed portfolio managers who design services to focus on high-net-worth clients. Large banks and large brokerage houses create segmentation marketing-strategies to sell both proprietary and non-proprietary products and services to investors designated as potential high-net-worth clients. Independent wealth-managers use their experience in estate planning, risk management, and their affiliations with tax and legal specialists, to manage the diverse holdings of high-net-worth clients. Banks and brokerage firms use advisory talent-pools to aggregate these same services.

The Great Recession of the late 2000s caused investors to address concerns within their portfolios. For this reason wealth managers have been advised that clients have a greater need to understand, access, and communicate with advisers about their situation.

Life goals

As awareness of wealth management has become more common, some companies have shifted towards a model which asks clients about life goals, working environments, and spending patterns as a way to increase communication. The industry-recognized wealth management was more than an investment advisory discipline. 
In 2015,  United Capital rebranded their wealth management services using the term "financial life management", which, according to the company, was intended to more clearly define the difference between wealth management companies and more affordable brokerage firms. The same year Merrill Lynch began a program, Merrill Lynch Clear, which asks investors to describe life goals, and includes an educational program for clients' children. For clients looking to leverage their wealth for the sake of achieving philanthropical and charitable goals, social finance investments may be included.

Private banking and wealth management rankings 

According to Euromoney's annual Private banking and wealth management ranking 2013, which consider (amongst other factors) assets under management, net income and net new assets, global private banking assets under management grew just 10.8%YoY (compared with 16.7% ten years ago).

The largest private banks and wealth managers in the world as of 2018 are as follows:

See also
Multi-family office
 Private banking
 Robo-advisor

References

Further reading
Spear's Wealth Management Survey,

External links
 Investment Management U.S. Treasury Handbook

Stock market
Investment management
Financial services occupations
Financial management